Ernest Thompson (born 1949) is an American writer, actor and director.

Ernest Thompson may also refer to:

 Ernie Thompson (rugby league), English rugby league footballer of the 1930s
 Ernest Heber Thompson (1891–1971), New Zealand artist
 Ernest O. Thompson (1892–1966), general in the United States Army during World War I
 Ernie Thompson (American football) (born 1969), American football running back
 Ernie Thompson (footballer, born 1892), English footballer
 Ernie Thompson (footballer, born 1909) (1909–1985), English footballer
 E. V. Thompson (1931–2012), English author of historical novels
 Ernest Thompson (musician), blind street musician from Winston-Salem, North Carolina